Farris B. Streeter (September 24, 1819 – August 19, 1877) was an American attorney, legislator and jurist from Pennsylvania who served as a Democratic member of the Pennsylvania Senate for the 10th district from 1847 to 1850 and as Solicitor of the United States Treasury from 1853 to 1858.

Biography
Ferris B. Streeter was born in Harford Township, Pennsylvania on September 24, 1819.  He attended Harford Academy and the Clinton Liberal Institute in Clinton, New York, afterwards becoming a teacher at Harford Academy.

Streeter studied law and was admitted to the bar in 1841, afterwards establishing a practice in Susquehanna County, Pennsylvania.

From 1843 to 1847 Streeter served as a deputy prosecuting attorney for Susquehanna County.

A Democrat, Streeter served in the Pennsylvania Senate for the 10th district from 1847 to 1850.

Streeter was appointed Solicitor of the United States Treasury in 1853, and served until 1858, resigning over disagreement with Franklin Pierce's policy on the admission of Kansas to the Union.

In 1859 Streeter was a Delegate to the Pennsylvania State Democratic Convention.

Having joined the Republican Party, in March, 1865 Streeter was appointed a Judge of the Pennsylvania District Court.  He won successive reelections and served until his death in 1877.

Streeter died on August 19, 1877 and is interred at the Montrose Cemetery in Montrose, Pennsylvania.

References

|-

1819 births
1877 deaths
19th-century American politicians
Burials in Pennsylvania
Pennsylvania district justices
Pennsylvania lawyers
Democratic Party Pennsylvania state senators
People from Susquehanna County, Pennsylvania
United States Department of the Treasury officials
19th-century American judges
19th-century American lawyers